Fernando Guzmán Solórzano (30 May 1812 in Tipitapa – 19 October 1891 in Granada) was the President of Nicaragua from 1 March 1867 to 1 March 1871. 
He was a member of the Conservative Party.

He was a relative of Carlos José Solórzano, President of Nicaragua in 1920s.

References

1812 births
1891 deaths
People from Managua Department
Presidents of Nicaragua
Conservative Party (Nicaragua) politicians
19th-century Nicaraguan people